Robert L. Carothers (born September 3, 1942) served as the tenth president of the University of Rhode Island from 1991 to 2009.

He received his B.A. degree from Edinboro University in Pennsylvania in 1965. He joined Delta Sigma Phi fraternity and was elected the President of the Fraternity twice. Carothers earned a Ph.D. degree at Kent State University in 1969. He also obtained a J.D. degree from the McDowell School of Law, University of Akron in 1980.

Carothers retired in May 2009.  David M. Dooley, former Provost at the Montana State University, took over as the University's 11th President.

References

1942 births
Living people
People from Rhode Island
University of Rhode Island faculty
Kent State University alumni
University of Akron alumni
Edinboro University of Pennsylvania alumni
Presidents of the University of Rhode Island